Randall Dougherty (born 1961) is an American mathematician. Dougherty has made contributions in widely varying areas of mathematics, including set theory, 
logic, real analysis, discrete mathematics, computational geometry, information theory, and coding theory.

Dougherty is a three-time winner of the U.S.A. Mathematical Olympiad (1976, 1977, 1978) and a three-time medalist in the International Mathematical Olympiad. He is also a three-time Putnam Fellow (1978, 1979, 1980).  Dougherty earned his Ph.D. in 1985 at University of California, Berkeley under the direction of Jack Silver.

With Matthew Foreman he showed that the Banach-Tarski decomposition is possible with pieces with the Baire property, solving a problem of Marczewski that remained unsolved for more than 60 years.
With Chris Freiling and Ken Zeger, he showed that linear codes are insufficient to gain the full advantages of network coding.

Selected publications

References

1961 births
Living people
20th-century American mathematicians
21st-century American mathematicians
University of California, Berkeley alumni
Ohio State University faculty
International Mathematical Olympiad participants
Putnam Fellows